Callidagonum pallidum is a species of beetle in the family Carabidae, the only species in the genus Callidagonum.

References

Platyninae